Sudhir Sharma (born 2 August 1972)  is a former Minister of Housing, Urban Development and Town & Country Planning in the Government of Himachal Pradesh. Sudhir Sharma was first elected to Himachal Pradesh State Assembly in 2003 from Baijnath Constituency. He won again from Baijnath in 2007. In 2012 he won from Dharmshala for third time.

Personal life
Sudhir Sharma was born on 2 August 1972 at Chaubin, Tehsil Baijnath, District. Kangra HP.
His father Pt. Sant Ram was Cabinet Minister in Himachal Pradesh Government and was President of the Himachal Pradesh Congress Committee. 
He is married to Reena Sharma and has one daughter Aadhya Pandit.

Political career
Remained Secretary, NSUI, District. Kangra, 1991.

General Secretary: Youth Congress, District. Kangra, 1994.

General Secretary State Youth Congress, 1996–2003.

Elected President, Kangra Yuva Kala Manch, 1997.

Member, State Congress Committee (PCC), 2002 onwards.

Observer For J & K in 2001 for Indian Youth Congress membership drive.

Observer AICC for Disha 2004 program for Gujarat and Pune.

Observer AICC for state Assembly Elections in Madhya Pradesh, Punjab, J & K, Rajasthan.

Elected to Pradesh Vidhan Sabha, 2003.

Remained Parliamentary Secretary, MPP & Power (H.P. Govt.), 18 April 2005 to 18 August 2005.

Elected again to State Assembly, December 2007.

General Secretary Spokesman PCC, 2008.

Elected to State Assembly in December, 2012.

Secretary All India Congress Committee, 2018.

References

Living people
1972 births
Indian National Congress politicians
Himachal Pradesh MLAs 2007–2012
Himachal Pradesh MLAs 2012–2017
People from Kangra district